Hotel of Secrets (German: Hotelgeheimnisse) or The Adventuress from Biarritz (Die Abenteurerin von Biarritz) is a 1929 German silent film directed by Friedrich Feher and starring Gertrud Eysoldt, Magda Sonja and Angelo Ferrari. It was shot at the Staaken Studios in Berlin and on location in Biarritz. The film's art direction was by Ernst Meiwers and Ernö Metzner.

Cast
 Gertrud Eysoldt as Herzogin  
 Magda Sonja as Gesellschafterin der Herzogin  
 Angelo Ferrari as Der Hochstapler  
 Wolfgang Zilzer as Komplize des Hochstaplers  
 Livio Pavanelli as Prosecutor
 Gertrud de Lalsky as Gräfin de Suzy  
 May Calvin as Lila  
 Harry Frank as Lilas Verlobter  
 Alfred Gerasch as Kriminalinspektor  
 Bobby Burns as Kind

References

Bibliography
 Sara Pendergast. Writers and production artists. St. James Press, 2000.

External links

1929 films
Films of the Weimar Republic
Films directed by Friedrich Feher
German silent feature films
German black-and-white films
Films shot at Staaken Studios
Films shot in France